De Forest may refer to:

People
 Carmaig de Forest, American singer-songwriter
 Emmelie de Forest, Danish singer
 Henry S. De Forest, American politician
 Jessé de Forest, leader of Walloons that fled Europe due to religious prosecution and settled in New York City
 John William De Forest, American writer
 John de Forest, English golfer, later known as John de Bendern
 Lee De Forest, American inventor with over 300 patents to his credit
 Lockwood de Forest, American designer
 Maurice Arnold de Forest, racing driver, aviator and politician in Great Britain
 Robert E. De Forest, American politician
 Roy De Forest, American painter

Others
 De Forest, Wisconsin, a village in Dane County
 De Forest (crater), a lunar surface feature named after Lee De Forest

See also
 DeForest (disambiguation)